Guadana is a genus of South American huntsman spiders that was first described by C. A. Rheims in 2010.

Species
 it contains twelve species, found in Ecuador, Peru, Brazil and French Guiana:
Guadana alpahuayo Rheims, 2021 – Peru
Guadana amendoim Rheims, 2021 – Peru
Guadana arawak Rheims, 2021 – French Guiana
Guadana manauara Rheims, 2010 (type) – Brazil
Guadana mapia Rheims, 2021 – Brazil
Guadana muirpinima Rheims, 2021 – Brazil
Guadana neblina Rheims, 2010 – Brazil
Guadana panguana Rheims, 2010 – Peru
Guadana quillu Rheims, 2010 – Ecuador
Guadana tambopata Rheims, 2010 – Peru
Guadana ucayali Rheims, 2021 – Peru
Guadana urucu Rheims, 2010 – Brazil

See also
 List of Sparassidae species

References

Araneomorphae genera
Sparassidae
Spiders of South America